In mathematics, a linear equation is an equation that may be put in the form
The coefficients may be considered as parameters of the equation, and may be arbitrary expressions, provided they do not contain any of the variables. To yield a meaningful equation, the coefficients  are required to not all be zero.

Alternatively, a linear equation can be obtained by equating to zero a linear polynomial over some field, from which the coefficients are taken.

The solutions of such an equation are the values that, when substituted for the unknowns, make the equality true.

In the case of just one variable, there is exactly one solution (provided that ). Often, the term linear equation refers implicitly to this particular case, in which the variable is sensibly called the unknown.

In the case of two variables, each solution may be interpreted as the Cartesian coordinates of a point of the Euclidean plane. The solutions of a linear equation form a line in the Euclidean plane, and, conversely, every line can be viewed as the set of all solutions of a linear equation in two variables. This is the origin of the term linear for describing this type of equations. More generally, the solutions of a linear equation in  variables form a hyperplane (a subspace of dimension ) in the Euclidean space of dimension .

Linear equations occur frequently in all mathematics and their applications in physics and engineering, partly because non-linear systems are often well approximated by linear equations.
 
This article considers the case of a single equation with coefficients from the field of real numbers, for which one studies the real solutions. All of its content applies to complex solutions and, more generally, for linear equations with coefficients and solutions in any field. For the case of several simultaneous linear equations, see system of linear equations.

One variable 

Two variables

It has infinitely many possible solutions.

Linear function

If , the equation 

This defines a function. The graph of this function is a line with slope  and -intercept  The functions whose graph is a line are generally called linear functions in the context of calculus. However, in linear algebra, a linear function is a function that maps a sum to the sum of the images of the summands. So, for this definition, the above function is linear only when , that is when the line passes through the origin. For avoiding confusion, the functions whose graph is an arbitrary line are often called affine functions.

Geometric interpretation

Each solution  of a linear equation
 
may be viewed as the Cartesian coordinates of a point in the Euclidean plane. Conversely, every line is the set of all solutions of a linear equation.

The phrase "linear equation" takes its origin in this correspondence between lines and equations: a linear equation in two variables is an equation whose solutions form a line.

If , the line is the graph of the function of  that has been defined in the preceding section.

Equation of a line
There are various ways of defining a line. In the following subsections, a linear equation of the line is given in each case.

Slope–intercept form or Gradient-intercept form
A non-vertical line can be defined by its slope , and its -intercept  (the  coordinate of its intersection with the -axis). In this case its linear equation can be written 

If, moreover, the line is not horizontal, it can be defined by its slope and its -intercept . In this case, its equation can be written

or, equivalently,

These forms rely on the habit of considering a non vertical line as the graph of a function. For a line given by an equation 

these forms can be easily deduced from the relations

Point–slope form or Point-gradient form

A non-vertical line can be defined by its slope , and the coordinates  of any point of the line. In this case, a linear equation of the line is

or 

This equation can also be written

for emphasizing that the slope of a line can be computed from the coordinates of any two points.

Intercept form
A line that is not parallel to an axis and does not pass through the origin cuts the axes in two different points.

Two-point form
There are several ways to write a linear equation of this line.

If , the slope of the line is  Thus, a point-slope form is

By clearing denominators, one gets the equation 

which is valid also when  (for verifying this, it suffices to verify that the two given points satisfy the equation).

This form is not symmetric in the two given points, but a symmetric form can be obtained by regrouping the constant terms:

(exchanging the two points changes the sign of the left-hand side of the equation).

Determinant form
The two-point form of the equation of a line can be expressed simply in terms of a determinant. There are two common ways for that.

The equation  is the result of expanding the determinant in the equation

The equation  can be obtained be expanding with respect to its first row the determinant in the equation

Beside being very simple and mnemonic, this form has the advantage of being a special case of the more general equation of a hyperplane passing through  points in a space of dimension . These equations rely on the condition of linear dependence of points in a projective space.

More than two variables
A linear equation with more than two variables may always be assumed to have the form

The coefficient , often denoted  is called the constant term (sometimes the absolute term in old books).

When dealing with  variables, it is common to use  and  instead of indexed variables.

A solution of such an equation is a -tuples such that substituting each element of the tuple for the corresponding variable transforms the equation into a true equality.

For an equation to be meaningful, the coefficient of at least one variable must be non-zero. In fact, if every variable has a zero coefficient, then, as mentioned for one variable, the equation is either inconsistent (for ) as having no solution, or all  are solutions.

In the case of three variable, this hyperplane is a plane.

If the coefficients are real numbers, this defines a real-valued function of  real variables.

See also 
 Linear equation over a ring
 Algebraic equation
 Linear inequality
 Nonlinear equation

Notes

References

External links 
 

Elementary algebra
Equations